The New Hampshire Wildcats represented the University of New Hampshire in the Women's Hockey East Association during the 2020–21 NCAA Division I women's ice hockey season. Redshirt junior goaltender Ava Boutilier served in the capacity of team captain.

Regular season

Standings

Roster

2020-21 Wildcats

Awards and honors
Ava Boutilier, Hockey East Co-Player of the Week (awarded January 25, 2021)

Brianna Brooks, Hockey East Rookie of the Week (awarded January 25, 2021) 

Lindsey Dumond, New Hampshire, 2021 Hockey East Best Defensive Forward Award

Nicole Kelly, 2020-21 Hockey East Pro Ambitions All-Rookie Team

Team Awards
Karyn L. Bye Most Valuable Player Award – Ava Boutilier
Colleen Coyne Best Defensive Player Award – Maddie Truax and Emily Rickwood
Sue Merz 7th Player Award – Charli Kettyle
Tricia Dunn Most Improved Player Award – Lindsey Dumond
Rookie of the Year Award – Nicole Kelly
Blue Line Club Award – Lauren Martin
Dr. Allison Edgar Academic Award – Nikki Harnett

References

New Hampshire Wildcats
New Hampshire Wildcats women's ice hockey seasons